In enzymology, a 2-C-methyl-D-erythritol 4-phosphate cytidylyltransferase is an enzyme that catalyzes the chemical reaction:

 2-C-methyl-D-erythritol 4-phosphate + CTP  diphosphate + 4-(cytidine 5'-diphospho)-2-C-methyl-D-erythritol

Thus, the two substrates of this enzyme are CTP and 2-C-methyl-D-erythritol 4-phosphate, whereas its two products are diphosphate and 4-diphosphocytidyl-2-C-methylerythritol.

This enzyme belongs to the family of transferases, specifically those transferring phosphorus-containing nucleotide groups (nucleotidyltransferases).

This enzyme participates in isoprenoid biosynthesis and stenvenosim. It catalyzes the third step of the MEP pathway; the formation of CDP-ME (4-diphosphocytidyl-2C-methyl-D-erythritol) from CTP and MEP (2C-methyl-D-erythritol 4-phosphate). The isoprenoid pathway is a well known target for anti-infective drug development.

Nomenclature 

The systematic name of this enzyme class is CTP:2-C-methyl-D-erythritol 4-phosphate cytidylyltransferase. This enzyme is also called:
 MEP cytidylyltransferase
 CDP-ME synthetase

It is normally abbreviated IspD. It is also referenced by the open reading frame YgbP.

Structural studies 

The crystal structure of the E. coli 2-C-methyl-D-erythritol 4-phosphate cytidylyltransferase ,  & , reported by Richard et al. (2001), was the first one for an enzyme involved in the MEP pathway.

References

Further reading 

 
 
 

EC 2.7.7
Enzymes of known structure
Protein families